Isle Brevelle is a community, which began as a Louisiana Creole settlement and is located in Natchitoches Parish, Louisiana. For many years this area was known as Côte Joyeuse (English: Joyous Coast).

Location 
Located in the Natchitoches Parish in Louisiana, in approximately 18,000 acres of land between the Cane River and Bayou Brevelle (near Montrose). Two major highways in Isle Brevelle include LA 119 and LA 484.

History 
Isle Brevelle is named after Jean Baptiste Brevel, Jr., the 18th century explorer and soldier of the Natchitoches Militia.  He is the son of Jean Baptiste Brevelle, a Parisian born trader and explorer, and his Caddo Indian wife, Anne Marie des Cadeaux. Jean Baptiste Brevel Jr. was granted the island by David Pain, the subdelegate at Natchitoches in 1765 for his service to the French and Spanish crowns as a Caddo Indian translator and explorer of Arkansas, Oklahoma, Texas, and New Mexico. 

The island is a narrow strip of land some thirty miles in length with three- to four-mile breadth located south of Natchitoches, Louisiana.  It is delineated and split by waterways to include the Cane River, Red River, Old River, and Brevelle Bayou (named after Jean Baptiste Brevel). Isle Brevelle was considered "the richest cotton growing portion of the south". Father Yves-Marie LeConiniat, a priest from France, referred to it as an "earthly paradise". 

As the colony changed hands from France to Spain, the spelling of the Brevel surname changed to Brevelle. The Brevelle Plantation grew to become one of the largest plantations in the South producing cotton, tobacco, indigo, lumber, bear grease, cattle, and food crops.   

The Louisiana Creole community is made of descendants of French and Spanish colonials, Africans, Native Americans, and Anglo-Americans.  

Nicolas Augustin Metoyer (1768–1856), was the son of Marie Thérèse Coincoin and Claude Thomas Pierre Métoyer, and he has been considered the "grandfather" of the community of Isle Brevelle. He was born into slavery and remained in bondage (initially to Don Manuel Antonio de Soto y Bermúdez and wife Marie des Nieges de St. Denis DeSoto) until 1792, at the age of 24. Around this same time his mother, Marie Thérèse Coincoin was also freed from enslavement and they, as a family started collecting local land, which eventually amassed to 6,000 acres. At the center of this collected land was Isle Brevelle. During this era and in this location, mulatto people lived similarly to white Southern planters, in large mansions with expensive furniture, and in some cases they held their own slaves. Nicolas Augustin Metoyer's home no longer stands, but the church he built, St. Augustine Parish still does.

Notable places 

 Badin-Roque House
 Coincoin–Prudhomme House (or Maison de Marie Thérèse)
 Melrose Plantation
 St. Augustine Parish

Notable people 

 Kellyn LaCour-Conant, restoration ecologist
 Marie Thérèse Metoyer (1742–1816), a planter, former slave turned slave owner, and businesswoman.
Clementine Hunter (c. 1887–1988), self taught folk artist, she lived at the Melrose Plantation within Isle Brevelle.
Billie Stroud (1919–2010), self taught folk artist, used Isle Brevelle as one subject of her work and spent time there.

References 

Natchitoches Parish, Louisiana
Louisiana Creole culture in New Orleans
Cane River National Heritage Area
Louisiana African American Heritage Trail